Kate Lieber is an American politician, currently currently serving as Majority Leader of the Oregon State Senate. She represents Oregon's 14th Senate district, which includes the cities of Beaverton, Aloha, and portions of Washington and Multnomah counties.

Professional background
Prior to her election to the Oregon Senate, Lieber worked for many years as an attorney prosecuting domestic violence and child abuse cases for the Multnomah County District Attorney's office. She was nominated by Governor Ted Kulongoski to the Psychiatric Security Review Board (PSRB) on which she served for eight years (and chaired for five).

Political career
Lieber was first inspired to run for public office after the election of Donald Trump as US President. She ran for the District 14 seat in the Oregon Senate after incumbent Democrat Mark Hass decided to run for Oregon Secretary of State, instead of re-election. She defeated Republican candidate Harmony Mulkey in the general election, winning 69% to 30.8%, with 0.2% of the vote going to other candidates.

Personal life
Lieber is gay and is the first openly lesbian member of the Oregon Senate. She lives with her wife and two children.

References

21st-century American politicians
Democratic Party Oregon state senators
LGBT state legislators in Oregon
Living people
Year of birth missing (living people)